The 2022 Oxford City Council election took place on 5 May 2022 as part of the 2022 local elections to elect councillors to Oxford City Council, the district council for the city of Oxford, England. Half of the 48 seats on the council were up for election, one councillor for each of the 24 wards.

Background
Oxford City Council is a district council which elects 24 of its 48 members every two years. In the 2021 election, all 48 members were elected after boundary changes in the first full election to the council since 2002. Labour won an outright majority, with 34 seats.

The 2022 local elections are seen as a wider indication of public opinion on Boris Johnson's government and the Partygate scandal, as well as the leadership of Keir Starmer, the Labour leader, and Ed Davey, the leader of the Liberal Democrats.

Results summary

Ward Results 
Results are taken from the Oxford City Council website.

Barton and Sandhill

Blackbird Leys

Carfax and Jericho

Churchill

Cowley

Cutteslowe and Sunnymead

Donnington

Headington

Headington Hill and Northway

Hinksey Park

Holywell

Littlemore

Lye Valley

Marston

Northfield Brook

Osney and St Thomas

Quarry and Risinghurst

Rose Hill and Iffley

St. Clement's

St. Mary's

Summertown

Temple Cowley

Walton Manor

Wolvercote

By-elections

Littlemore

References

Oxford City Council elections
Oxford
2020s in Oxford